Dave Hibbert may refer to:

 David Hibbert (born 1986), English footballer
 Dave Hibbert (American football) (1938–2009), American football player